Mike Hunter (born September 14, 1959 – died February 8, 2006) was an American professional boxer who won the USBA Heavyweight title and the WBC Continental Americas Cruiserweight title.

Professional career
Known as "The Bounty Hunter", Hunter was a colourful and erratic Heavyweight fringe contender during the early-to-mid 1990s, and was known for his unique boxing style, boxing skills, and good defense.  Hunter's boxing career began in Maryland, after a seven-year stint in prison for armed robbery. Hunter's skills caught the attention of actor James Caan, who would manage Hunter for three years, before selling his contract to Bill Slayton. Hunter first became ranked by the major sanctioning bodies in 1990, and would defeat many notable boxers like Dwight Qawi, Pinklon Thomas, Tyrell Biggs, Oliver McCall, Jimmy Thunder, and Alexander Zolkin. During this long respectable run of results he lost a highly criticized points decision to fellow contender Francois Botha, after dropping Botha in the first round.

Although he was a very talented fighter and had a promising run during the 90s, he largely squandered his talent.  By the mid-1990s, drug problems had begun to catch up to Hunter, evident to all after his victory over Buster Mathis, Jr., which was turned to a No-Contest following a positive drug test.

Hunter would lose three fights in the last year and a half of his career, before retiring following a loss to Danish Heavyweight Brian Nielsen for the IBO version of the heavyweight title.

Professional boxing record

|-
|align="center" colspan=8|26 Wins (8 knockouts, 18 decisions), 7 Losses (1 knockout, 6 decisions), 2 Draws, 1 No Contest 
|-
| align="center" style="border-style: none none solid solid; background: #e3e3e3"|Result
| align="center" style="border-style: none none solid solid; background: #e3e3e3"|Record
| align="center" style="border-style: none none solid solid; background: #e3e3e3"|Opponent
| align="center" style="border-style: none none solid solid; background: #e3e3e3"|Type
| align="center" style="border-style: none none solid solid; background: #e3e3e3"|Round
| align="center" style="border-style: none none solid solid; background: #e3e3e3"|Date
| align="center" style="border-style: none none solid solid; background: #e3e3e3"|Location
| align="center" style="border-style: none none solid solid; background: #e3e3e3"|Notes
|-align=center
|Loss
|26–7–2 
|align=left| Brian Nielsen
|TKO
|5
|31/05/1996
|align=left| Copenhagen, Denmark
|align=left|
|-
|-align=center
|Win
|26–6–2 
|align=left| Arthur Weathers
|PTS
|10
|03/11/1995
|align=left| Las Vegas, Nevada, U.S.
|align=left|
|-
|-align=center
|Loss
|25–6–2 
|align=left| Marion Wilson
|SD
|10
|06/10/1995
|align=left| Atlantic City, New Jersey, U.S.
|
|-
|-align=center
|Win
|25–5–2 
|align=left| Will Hinton
|PTS
|10
|06/05/1995
|align=left| Las Vegas, Nevada, U.S.
|align=left|
|-
|-align=center
|Loss
|24–5–2 
|align=left| Aurelio Perez
|UD
|10
|24/03/1995
|align=left| Sao Paulo, Brazil
|
|-
|-align=center
|Loss
|24–4–2 
|align=left| Alexander Zolkin
|SD
|10
|16/12/1994
|align=left| Chester, West Virginia, U.S.
|align=left|
|-
|-align=center
|Win
|24–3–2 
|align=left| Keith McMurray
|SD
|10
|01/09/1994
|align=left| Albuquerque, New Mexico, U.S.
|
|-
|-align=center
|Win
|23–3–2 
|align=left| Craig Payne
|PTS
|10
|19/05/1994
|align=left| Las Vegas, Nevada, U.S.
|align=left|
|-
|-align=center
|style="background:#ddd;"|NC
|22–3–2 
|align=left| Buster Mathis Jr.
|NC
|12
|04/12/1993
|align=left| Corpus Christi, Texas, U.S.
|align=left|
|-
|-align=center
|Win
|22–3–2
|align=left| Cecil Coffee
|UD
|10
|06/11/1993
|align=left| Sun City, South Africa
|
|-
|-align=center
|Win
|21–3–2
|align=left| Alexander Zolkin
|SD
|12
|05/08/1993
|align=left| Las Vegas, Nevada, U.S.
|align=left|
|-
|-align=center
|Win
|20–3–2
|align=left| Tyrell Biggs
|UD
|12
|17/01/1993
|align=left| Las Vegas, Nevada, U.S.
|align=left|
|-
|-align=center
|Loss
|19–3–2
|align=left| Francois Botha
|MD
|8
|22/09/1992
|align=left| El Paso, Texas, U.S.
|
|-
|-align=center
|Win
|19–2–2
|align=left| David Jaco
|TKO
|3
|14/02/1992
|align=left| Las Vegas, Nevada, U.S.
|align=left|
|-
|-align=center
|Win
|18–2–2
|align=left| Ossie Ocasio
|UD
|10
|14/12/1990
|align=left| Sydney, Australia
|align=left|
|-
|-align=center
|Win
|17–2–2
|align=left| Jose Maria Flores Burlon
|TKO
|1
|31/10/1990
|align=left| Melbourne, Australia
|
|-
|-align=center
|Win
|16–2–2
|align=left| Jimmy Thunder
|KO
|4
|14/08/1990
|align=left| Melbourne, Australia
|align=left|
|-
|-align=center
|Win
|15–2–2
|align=left| Pinklon Thomas
|UD
|10
|12/06/1990
|align=left| Fort Bragg, North Carolina, U.S.
|
|-
|-align=center
|Win
|14–2–2
|align=left| Dwight Muhammad Qawi
|UD
|12
|16/03/1990
|align=left| Newark, New Jersey, U.S.
|align=left|
|-
|-align=center
|Win
|13–2–2
|align=left| Donald Coats
|KO
|3
|31/01/1989
|align=left| Irvine, California, U.S.
|align=left|
|-
|-align=center
|Win
|12–2–2
|align=left| Wade Parsons
|UD
|8
|06/12/1988
|align=left| Halifax, Nova Scotia, Canada
|align=left|
|-
|-align=center
|Win
|11–2–2
|align=left| Dino Homsey
|KO
|4
|26/07/1988
|align=left| Los Angeles, California, U.S.
|align=left|
|-
|-align=center
|Win
|10–2–2
|align=left| Oliver McCall
|UD
|10
|22/01/1988
|align=left| Atlantic City, New Jersey, U.S.
|align=left|
|-
|-align=center
|Loss
|9–2–2
|align=left| Andre Smith
|UD
|8
|05/11/1987
|align=left| Los Angeles, California, U.S.
|align=left|
|-
|-align=center
|Win
|9–1–2
|align=left| Rodney Stockton
|TKO
|1
|29/09/1987
|align=left| Los Angeles, California, U.S.
|align=left|
|-
|-align=center
|Win
|8–1–2
|align=left| Gary Lightbourne
|KO
|1
|25/08/1987
|align=left| Los Angeles, California, U.S.
|
|-
|-align=center
|Loss
|7–1–2
|align=left| Levi Billups
|SD
|8
|18/05/1987
|align=left| Inglewood, California, U.S.
|
|-
|-align=center
|Win
|7–0–2
|align=left| Mike Gans
|UD
|8
|28/04/1987
|align=left| Los Angeles, California, U.S.
|align=left|
|-
|-align=center
|style="background: #c5d2ea"|Draw
|6–0–2
|align=left| James Pritchard
|PTS
|6
|20/02/1987
|align=left| Atlantic City, New Jersey, U.S.
|align=left|
|-
|-align=center
|Win
|6–0–1
|align=left| Kelvin Beatty
|UD
|6
|02/01/1987
|align=left| Atlantic City, New Jersey, U.S.
|align=left|
|-
|-align=center
|Win
|5–0–1
|align=left| Ken Crosby
|TKO
|5
|02/10/1986
|align=left| Atlantic City, New Jersey, U.S.
|align=left|
|-align=center
|-
|-align=center
|style="background: #c5d2ea"|Draw
|4–0–1
|align=left| Woody Clark
|PTS
|6
|23/08/1986
|align=left| Fayetteville, North Carolina, U.S.
|align=left|
|-
|-align=center
|Win
|4–0 
|align=left| Avery Rawls
|UD
|8
|11/04/1986
|align=left| Las Vegas, Nevada, U.S.
|align=left|
|-
|-align=center
|Win
|3–0 
|align=left| Dominic Parker
|UD
|6
|02/03/1986
|align=left| Lancaster, Pennsylvania, U.S.
|align=left|
|-
|-align=center
|Win
|2–0 
|align=left| Donald Vance
|PTS
|4
|18/01/1986
|align=left| Staunton, Virginia, U.S.
|align=left|
|-
|-align=center
|Win
|1–0 
|align=left| Warren Thompson
|SD
|4
|14/12/1985
|align=left| Largo, Maryland, U.S.
|align=left|
|}

Life after boxing
Hunter returned to the sport in September 2005, working as an instructor and trainer at the Tru Boxing Gym in Hollywood.

Death
On February 8, 2006, Hunter was on the roof of the St. Moritz Hotel in Los Angeles, when he encountered two Los Angeles police officers, who had set up a buy/bust sting operation surveillance. The officers reported that Hunter, who was unprovoked, hit an officer on the head with a gun. The other officer tackled Hunter, with the previous officer eventually joining in the struggle. Hunter broke free, and pointed his gun at the officers, who promptly shot him twice, in the chest and the arm. Hunter was taken to Cedars-Sinai Hospital, where he died. The two officers involved stated that they did not feel that Hunter was aware that they were police officers.

Personal

His son Michael Hunter, Jr. became US amateur champ in 2007.

Links and sources 
The Knockout Shot  (L.A. Weekly)

External links 
 

Boxers from South Carolina
1959 births
2006 deaths
Sportspeople from Greenville, South Carolina
American male boxers
Heavyweight boxers